Murder in Texas constitutes the intentional killing, under circumstances defined by law, of people within or under the jurisdiction of the U.S. state of Texas.

The United States Centers for Disease Control and Prevention reported that in the year 2020, the state had a murder rate slightly above the median for the entire country.

Felony murder rule
The felony murder rule in Texas, codified in Texas Penal Code § 19.02(b)(3), states that a person commits murder if they "commits or attempts to commit a felony, other than manslaughter, and in the course of and in furtherance of the commission or attempt, or in immediate flight from the commission or attempt, they commits or attempts to commit an act clearly dangerous to human life that causes the death of an individual."

The felony murder rule is sometimes confused with the law of parties, which states that a person can be criminally responsible for the actions of another by aiding or abeting, or conspires with the principal.

Penalties

References

See also
Law of Texas
Capital punishment in Texas
Texas judicial system
Common purpose

1973 legislation
Texas statutes
Murder in Texas
U.S. state criminal law